Eumysia pallidipennella is a species of snout moth in the genus Eumysia. It was described by George Duryea Hulst in 1895. It is found in the US state of California.

References

Moths described in 1895
Phycitinae